The Spanish Chamber of Commerce (Spanish: Cámara de Comercio Española) represents the interests of Spain in Taiwan in the absence of formal diplomatic relations, functioning as a de facto embassy. Its counterpart in Spain is the Taipei Economic and Cultural Office in Spain in Madrid. 

It also has a Consular Section, which is under the jurisdiction of the Spanish Consulate General in Manila in the Philippines.
 
The Chamber is headed by the Director General, Francisco de Borja Rengifo Llorens.

History
The organisation was first established in 1974, as the Centro de Cervantes. Previously, Spain recognised Taiwan as the Republic of China, and was represented by an embassy in Taipei. There were close relations between the governments of Francisco Franco and Chiang Kai-shek, both of which were anti-communist.  However, diplomatic relations were severed in 1973 when Spain recognised the People's Republic of China, leading to the establishment of the organisation, under the supervision of the Spanish Federation of Industry and Commerce.

See also
 List of diplomatic missions in Taiwan
 List of diplomatic missions of Spain

References

External links
Official website 

Taipei
1974 establishments in Taiwan
Representative Offices in Taipei
Organizations established in 1974
Spain–Taiwan relations